Ademola Okulaja (10 July 1975 – 17 May 2022) was a German professional basketball player. The last team he played for were the Brose Baskets of the Basketball Bundesliga. After his playing career, he became an agent for NBA player Dennis Schröder.

A 2.06 m (6' 9") forward, Okulaja received 172 caps for the German national team, serving as a team captain for many years and winning bronze at the 2002 World Championships. He played college basketball in the United States at North Carolina and flirted briefly with the NBA before moving on to a successful career in Europe.

Early life
The son of a German mother and a Nigerian father, Okulaja was born in Nigeria but moved to Berlin with his family at the age of three. In 1995, he graduated from John F. Kennedy School in Berlin, before enrolling at the University of North Carolina.

Collegiate career
Okulaja played college basketball at North Carolina from 1995 to 1999. During the 1997–98 NCAA season, he was a member of new coach Bill Guthridge's successful "six starters" rotation with Antawn Jamison, Vince Carter, Ed Cota, Shammond Williams and Makhtar N'Diaye. In his senior season, he was named MVP of the Tar Heels basketball team and won a spot on the 1998–99 All-Atlantic Coast Conference First Team. Okulaja was the first player in the history of UNC basketball who led the squad in scoring, rebounding, three-pointers made and steals.

Professional career
Okulaja played professionally for a variety of Euroleague teams, including ALBA Berlin in the 1994–95 season winning the FIBA Korać Cup and again in 1999–00, and later RheinEnergie Köln (2006–07) in Germany; CB Girona (2000–01 and 2003–04), Barcelona (2001–02), Unicaja Malaga (2002–03) and Pamesa Valencia (2004–05) in Spain; and Benetton Treviso in Italy (2004). His ALBA Berlin team won the 1999–00 German national (Bundesliga) championship. He won the "Rookie of the Year" award with Girona and was an All-League First Team selection that year.  In 2002, he won the award for "Most Spectacular Player" at the Spanish All-Star Game.

Okulaja had three different attempts to join the NBA; his first training camp experience was with the Philadelphia 76ers, then with the San Antonio Spurs and finally the Utah Jazz, but was unable to make an NBA roster.

In 2008, Okulaja was diagnosed with a spinal tumor and had to go into a one-year therapy. After it proved to be successful, he played one more season for the Brose Baskets.

In July 2010, he announced his retirement from professional basketball.

German national team
Okulaja was also an experienced member of the Germany national team and one of the key figures of the team, alongside Dirk Nowitzki and Patrick Femerling. He played with the team at the European Championships in 1995, 1997, 1999 and 2001. He competed with the German national team at the 2002 FIBA World Basketball Championship in the US, winning bronze, and in Japan at the 2006 FIBA World Basketball Championship.

Post-playing career 
Okulaja worked as analyst and commentator at Sport1, a German sports channel.

He founded pro4pros, a sports consulting company, and then became director of the German office of Octagon, a sports and entertainment company.

Okulaja died on 17 May 2022 in Berlin. He is survived by his wife and two children.

References

External links
Official website
Euroleague.net Profile
Fibaeurope.com Profile

1975 births
2022 deaths
Nigerian emigrants to Germany
Naturalized citizens of Germany
Alba Berlin players
BC Khimki players
Brose Bamberg players
CB Girona players
CB Lucentum Alicante players
Baloncesto Málaga players
FC Barcelona Bàsquet players
German expatriate basketball people in Spain
German expatriate basketball people in the United States
German expatriate basketball people in Italy
German expatriate basketball people in Russia
German men's basketball players
German sportspeople of Nigerian descent
German people of Yoruba descent
German sports agents
Liga ACB players
North Carolina Tar Heels men's basketball players
Pallacanestro Treviso players
Power forwards (basketball)
Sportspeople from Lagos
Valencia Basket players
Yoruba sportspeople
2006 FIBA World Championship players
2002 FIBA World Championship players
Basketball players from Berlin